The Everett AquaSox are a Minor League Baseball team in Everett, Washington. The team is a member of the Northwest League and is affiliated with the Seattle Mariners. The AquaSox play their home games at Funko Field, which has a seating capacity of 3,682. Everett has won three division titles and one Northwest League championship.

History
Following the 1983 season, Bob and Margaret Bavasi purchased the struggling Walla Walla, Washington, based Blue Mountain Bears. Antiquated facilities compounded by dwindling attendance in Walla Walla prompted the new owners to move the franchise. The Bavasis, who had secured affiliation with the San Francisco Giants, ultimately selected Everett as the relocation destination. Playing as the Everett Giants, the club was affiliated with San Francisco for eleven years until 1994. After the 1994 season, Everett signed a player development contract with the Seattle Mariners as their Class A Short Season affiliate and adopted a new unique name, the AquaSox. Since the 2021 season, the team has played at the High-A classification as a Mariners affiliate.

Identity
One of the team logos, used on road caps and jerseys, is based on the "trident" insignia used by the Mariners in the early 1980s (rotated to look like the letter "E" for Everett, instead of "M" for Mariners). Their mascot is Webbly, a frog. According to long-time team radio broadcaster Pat Dillon, "The frog is a cross between a Pacific tree frog and a Central American red-eyed tree frog—and Brooks Robinson." Previously, the mascot for the Everett Giants was a giant hot dog named Frank.

Season-by-season record

Northwest League (1995–present)

Roster

References

External links

San Francisco Giants minor league affiliates
Seattle Mariners minor league affiliates
Northwest League teams
Baseball teams established in 1995
1995 establishments in Washington (state)
Professional baseball teams in Washington (state)
Sports in Everett, Washington
High-A West teams